Avoca may refer to:

Places

Australia
Avoca, New South Wales
Avoca Beach, New South Wales
Avoca Lake, New South Wales
North Avoca, New South Wales
Avoca, Tasmania
Avoca, Queensland, a suburb of Bundaberg
Avoca, Victoria
Avoca River, Victoria
Avoca Dell, South Australia, on the northeastern outskirts of Murray Bridge

Canada
 Avoca Ravine, Toronto, Ontario

Ireland
Avoca, County Wicklow, the village
River Avoca, in County Wicklow

New Zealand
Avoca, New Zealand,  a locality in the Canterbury Region
Avoca River (Canterbury)
Avoca River (Hawke's Bay)

South Africa
Avoca, Durban, a suburb in KwaZulu-Natal

United States
Avoca, Arkansas
Avoca, Florida, an unincorporated community in Hamilton County
Avoca Township, Livingston County, Illinois
Avoca, Indiana
Avoca, Iowa
Avoca, Louisville, Kentucky
Avoca in Kenockee Township, Michigan
Avoca, Minnesota
Avoca, Nebraska
Avoca, New York
Avoca (village), New York
Avoca Township, Pottawatomie County, Oklahoma
Avoca, Oklahoma, a former small town in Avoca Township
Avoca, Pennsylvania
Avoca, Texas
Avoca (Altavista, Virginia), a historic home in Campbell County
Avoca, West Virginia
Avoca, Wisconsin

Other uses
Avoca Handweavers, an Irish clothing manufacturing, retail and food business
Avoca Hockey Club, a field hockey club in Dublin, Ireland

See also

 
 
 Vale of Avoca (disambiguation)